Kranichfeld is a Verwaltungsgemeinschaft in the district Weimarer Land in Thuringia, Germany. The seat of the Verwaltungsgemeinschaft is in Kranichfeld.

The Verwaltungsgemeinschaft Kranichfeld consists of the following municipalities:

 Hohenfelden 
 Klettbach 
 Kranichfeld
 Nauendorf 
 Rittersdorf 
 Tonndorf

References

Verwaltungsgemeinschaften in Thuringia